Christy Schwundeck was a German citizen of Nigerian descent. On 19 May 2011, she went to a job centre in Frankfurt-am-Main and asked for money because her benefits had stopped and she was hungry. She refused to leave the centre and when the police arrived, a situation developed in which an officer shot her in the stomach, killing her. Her death provoked outrage internationally. The police officer was cleared of all charges on the grounds of self-defence.

Early life

In 1995, Christy Schwundeck left Benin City in Nigeria and claimed asylum in Germany. She worked as a cleaner and gained a residence permit, becoming a German citizen. She married a German man, taking his last name. She lived in Aschaffenburg in Bavaria, where she experienced everyday racism because she was a black woman. Her marriage broke down in early 2011, although she remained friends with her ex-husband and in the spring she moved to Frankfurt.

Incident

Early on the morning of 19 May 2011, Schwundeck called her ex-husband in distress because the previous week she had applied to the job centre for financial assistance and received no reply. He advised her to go to the centre to ask for an advance. At 08:30, she went to the job centre on Mainzer Landstraße. She received benefits under the Hartz IV system but she had not received the latest installment on 1 May and had no money. She had previously received emergency cash at job centres in Aschaffenburg and Wiesbaden, as was legally mandated. In order to get to the centre, she was forced to travel on the train without a ticket. At the centre, she entered room 22 and asked for 10 euros in cash so she could buy food. The advisor refused to give her money and she decided to stay seated, leading to the security being called. The deputy team leader also became involved; he offered Schwundeck a food voucher which would be equivalent to her benefits in June, which she did not want to take. She continued to sit in her seat.

At 08:50, Frankfurt police received a call from the job centre saying that a woman was making trouble and refusing to leave. Two officers (one male, one female) parked outside the centre at 09:01 and went inside, finding four people in room 22, namely the advisor, the deputy team leader, a security guard and Christy Schwundeck. Schwundeck was still sitting on her seat with her bag on the table beside her. One officer asked her for identification and she put her hand inside the bag, but did not produce any identification.
When the male officer took her bag, she used a steak knife to stab him in his arm and belly. The female officer retreated to the door of the room and pulled her gun. She shouted, "" ('Drop the knife, or else I'll shoot!') When Schwundeck did not comply, she shot her. The female officer later stated that Schwundeck "had a totally crazy look, full of aggression, hatred and anger".

Schwundeck was shot in the stomach and died from her injuries. It was later recorded that she tested negative for drugs and had nothing in her stomach except a greenish-brownish liquid, with nine eurocents in her wallet. At the time of her death, she was 39.

Juridical process

In January 2012, the public prosecutor dropped the case against the female police officer, on the grounds that she had acted in self-defence. The prosecutor said that Schwundeck had run towards the female police officer, putting her in fear of her life. He said that use of pepper spray or a warning shot was impracticable in a small room. In March 2012, Der Spiegel reported that Schwundeck's brother and her ex-husband had made a legal complaint to the Public Prosecutor General which demanded a trial of the officer.

Legacy

The death of Schwundeck shocked the African diaspora. Claudia Czernohorsky-Grüneberg, head of Frankfurt's job centres, told the Hessenschau television programme that the request for 10 euros was legitimate. In an interview with T-Online, Siraad Wiedenroth (director of Initiative Schwarze Menschen) noted that the time between the police being called and the death of Schwundeck was less than an hour.

In 2019, demonstrators commemorated the deaths which they claimed had been caused by the Hartz IV system outside the Federal Constitutional Court, whilst the sanctions were being challenged. Black Lives Matter protestors in Germany drew links between the death of Schwundeck and other deaths in police custody such as those of Ousman Sey, Dominique Koumadio, Slieman Hamade and N'deye Mareame Sarr. Connections were also drawn with the death of Oury Jalloh.

At a memorial event in Frankfurt in 2021 which marked ten years since the death of Schwundeck, a representative of the Initiative Christy Schwundeck blamed the events on "deadly institutional racism".

See also
 Death of Achidi John

References

2011 deaths
21st century in Frankfurt
People shot dead by law enforcement officers in Germany
Nigerian emigrants to Germany